Hisham Al Shaar (born 1958) is a Syrian politician who served as the justice minister between 2017 and 2020.

Biography
Al Shaar was born in Damascus in 1958. In a cabinet reshuffle dated March 2017 he was appointed justice minister replacing Najm Hamad Al Ahmad in the post. Al Shaar is one of the Syrian politicians who were sanctioned by the European Union in 2017 and 2020.

References

1958 births
Living people
Syrian jurists
Politicians from Damascus
Syrian ministers of justice